is the name and title character of a tokusatsu TV series, later called . It was created by Kōhan Kawauchi, who also created Moonlight Mask. This B&W TV show was the first superhero TV series by Toei Company Ltd. It was broadcast on NET (now TV Asahi) from June 3, 1959 to June 30, 1960, with a total of 57 episodes divided into 7 segments. Aside from being Toei's first TV superhero show, this series was also the debut of actor Sonny Chiba, who was 19 at the time, who took over the title role from Susumu Namijima after Episode 32.

Summary
The hero of this series is a young detective named Kotarō Ran, unknown to anyone (even his friends), is a master of disguise, utilizing seven different personalities. Most of his disguises are odd characters, like a magician and a cigar-smoking Indian, but Kotarō's 7th disguise is the 2-gun-toting caped, golden-masked superhero, Seven Color Mask! In the first story arc called  the ally of justice Seven Color Mask must confront the evil Cobra Mask who terrorizes Japan. The police and Seven Color Mask must hunt down King Rose. The third story arc is called . The fourth story arc is called . This series was "remade" by creator Kawauchi in 1972 as  Warrior of Love Rainbowman, and it is also considered an inspiration behind Go Nagai's Cutey Honey.

Staff
Creator: Kōhan Kawauchi
Planning: Masahiro Sato, Yoshifumi Ohga
Screenplay: Kōhan Kawauchi, Saburo Yuki & Yoshinari Matsubara
Music: Hiro'oki Ogawa

Toei tokusatsu
Tokusatsu television series
1959 Japanese television series debuts
1960 Japanese television series endings
TV Asahi original programming